Gabriele "Gaby" Mancini (born 24 April 1940) is a Canadian former boxer of Italian descent. He competed in the men's featherweight event at the 1960 Summer Olympics.

1960 Olympic results
Below is the record of Gaby Mancini, a Canadian featherweight boxer who competed at the 1960 Rome Olympics:

 Round of 32: lost to Shinetsu Suzuki (Japan) by decision, 0-5

References

External links
 

1940 births
Living people
Canadian male boxers
Olympic boxers of Canada
Boxers at the 1960 Summer Olympics
Italian emigrants to Canada
Featherweight boxers